Salmon Bay is a portion of the Lake Washington Ship Canal, which passes through the city of Seattle, linking Lake Washington to Puget Sound, lying west of the Fremont Cut. It is the westernmost section of the canal and empties into Puget Sound's Shilshole Bay. Because of the Hiram M. Chittenden Locks, the smaller, western half of the bay is salt water, and the eastern half is fresh water (though not without saline contamination: see Lake Union). Before the construction of the Ship Canal, Salmon Bay was entirely salt water.

East of the locks, Salmon Bay is spanned by the Ballard Bridge, a bascule bridge that carries 15th Avenue traffic between Ballard and Interbay. West of the locks, it is spanned by the Salmon Bay Bridge that carries the BNSF Railway railroad tracks between Ballard and Magnolia.

References

Landforms of Seattle
Bays of Washington (state)
Bays of King County, Washington